St-Prex railway station is a railway station in the municipality of Saint-Prex, in the Swiss canton of Vaud. It is an intermediate stop on the standard gauge Lausanne–Geneva line of Swiss Federal Railways.

Services 
 the following services stop at St-Prex:

References

External links 
 
 

Railway stations in the canton of Vaud
Swiss Federal Railways stations